A Fine Romance is a British situation comedy starring husband-and-wife team Judi Dench and Michael Williams. The series was nominated for ten BAFTA British Academy Television Awards and was a winner of two for Dench's performances in 1982 and 1985.

Cast 
Judi Dench starred as the female lead, Laura, against Michael Williams as the male lead, Mike. Laura's matchmaking sister and brother-in-law were played by Susan Penhaligon and Richard Warwick, respectively.

Creatives, production, and broadcast 
A Fine Romance was written by Bob Larbey, and took its name from the Jerome Kern song, "A Fine Romance". Judi Dench recorded the song as the theme music of the production. It was produced for London Weekend Television by James Cellan Jones (series one and two), Don Leaver (series three and four), and Graham Evans (one episode in series four). It was first broadcast on 1November 1981, and lasted for twentysix episodes over four series. The final episode was broadcast on 17February 1984.

Plot 
The series follows the unlikely romance between Laura Dalton (Judi Dench), a translator, and Mike Selway (Michael Williams), a landscape gardener. Both are approaching middle-age, shy, content with being single, but with their own insecurities and career struggles. Laura's younger sister, Helen (Susan Penhaligon), and her husband Phil (Richard Warwick), are incurable matchmakers, and at one of their parties, they introduce her to Mike. Laura thinks Mike is nervous and boring but they agree to feign interest in one another so they can escape the party. However, as the first series develops, they are drawn to each other and begin a relationship.

The series follows the development of their relationship, although bad luck dogs them, from a dinner in France that does not turn out as expected, to a failed romantic evening watching television. They become estranged at the end of the third series, but find they cannot live without one another, and so get engaged in the last episode of the final series.

Episodes 
The following are the titles of each of the episodes in the four series, with the date of original airing given in parentheses.

Home releases 
All four series of A Fine Romance have been released on DVD by Network, with release dates as follows.

Awards and recognition 
The series was nominated for ten BAFTA British Academy Television Awards, winning twice for performances by Dench, in 1982 and 1985.

Footnotes

References

External links 
 
 
 

1981 British television series debuts
1984 British television series endings
1980s British sitcoms
English-language television shows
ITV sitcoms
London Weekend Television shows
1980s British romance television series